Bayfront MRT station is an underground Mass Rapid Transit (MRT) interchange station on the Downtown line (DTL) and Circle line (CCL). Located in the Downtown Core of Singapore, the station is underneath Bayfront Avenue and serves the main tourist attractions of Marina Bay Sands and Gardens by the Bay.

The station was first announced in 2005 as part of the Downtown Extension of the CCL, which was later revised to be the first stage of the DTL. In 2007, it was also announced that the station would interchange with the CCL branch to Marina Bay station. CCL services to the station first commenced in January 2012, while DTL services began in December 2013. The station features an Art-in-Transit artwork When the Ships Comes In by Lee Wen.

History

On 14 June 2005, the Land Transport Authority (LTA) announced that Bayfront station would be part of the Downtown Extension (DTE) from Milennia station (now Promenade) to Chinatown. The station would serve the upcoming integrated resort, now known as Marina Bay Sands. Initially planned to be a branch of the Circle line (CCL), the DTE was revised to be the first stage of the Downtown line (DTL) in 2007. The station would also be an interchange station with the  CCL branch to Marina Bay station.

The initial Chinese name for Bayfront station (贝弗兰) generated some controversy. Deputy local news editor of the Chinese-speaking newspaper Lianhe Zaobao Chua Chim Kang criticised the translation, calling it "meaningless" and perceived it as an "erosion" of the Chinese language. LTA subsequently changed the provisional Chinese name for the station to its existing translation that reflected the "maritime flavour" of the area served by the station, with "海湾" meaning "bay" and "舫" meaning "small boats".

The northern end of the station was designed by the developer of the Marina Bay Sands Integrated Resort. The station construction required coordination with Marina Bay Sands to integrate the station design with the resort. As announced on 28 November 2011, the station opened on 14 January 2012, with an official opening ceremony the day before. The DTL platforms commenced operations on 22 December 2013.

Station details

Bayfront station is a cross-platform interchange between the CCL and DTL with two island platforms. From the north, both the CCL and DTL go towards Promenade MRT station. To the south, the DTL goes towards  station while the CCL goes towards Marina Bay station. The official station code is CE1/DT16.

Located under Bayfront Avenue close to Marina Bay, Bayfront station serves Marina Bay Sands and Gardens by the Bay. The station has five entrances. Other landmarks surrounding the station include Helix Bridge, Art Science Museum, Merlion Park, Red Dot Design Museum, and The Fullerton Hotel.

Public art

When the Ships Comes In by Lee Wen is displayed along the station concourse as part of the Art-in-Transit programme, a showcase of public artworks on the MRT network. The work depicts a series of ships hand-drawn by Singaporean children aged 7 to 12. Based on fantasy or other existing ships, the designs included boats powered by whales and dragons, or those made of food and recycled bottles.

The When the Ships Comes In display pays tribute to the importance of Singapore as a port of call. The children's artwork recalls the history and projects the children's hope for the future. The artwork title is inspired by a Bob Dylan song of the same name, and the artist hoped to reflect the song's message of the value of life.

Over one thousand ship designs were created through workshops held in various primary schools and coordinated by the artist and his friends, including Chye Teck and Chun Kaiqun. Due to the limited space of the canvas, only some were selected based on the creativity of the design rather than how well-drawn the ships were. These were scanned into digital images, before the work was silkscreened on vitreous enamel panels.

References

Bibliography

External links
 
 SBS Transit's Bayfront MRT station official website
 

Railway stations in Singapore opened in 2012
Marina Bay, Singapore
Mass Rapid Transit (Singapore) stations